Oresas was a Pythagorean, according to Sir William Smith, (1870).

Smith (1870) noted (p. 40):
ORESAS, a Pythagorean. A fragment of his writings is preserved in Stobaeus, Eclog. p. 105. ( Fabric. Bibl. Graec. vol. i. p. 860.) [C. P. M.]

See also
Aesara

References

Pythagoreans
5th-century BC Greek people